The Tas series is a pair of children's science fiction novels written by Reginald Alec Martin, under the pseudonym of E. C. Eliott. The books were illustrated by A. Bruce Cornwell. They are set, at least at the beginning, at the Woomera Rocket Range in Australia.

Plot
Tas and his friends have adventures with rockets and spaceships.

Books 
 Tas and the Postal Rocket (1955)
 Tas and the Space Machine (1955)

References 
The Reginald Alec Martin Website

1955 science fiction novels
20th-century British novels
Science fiction book series
Children's science fiction novels
British science fiction novels
Space exploration novels
Novels set in South Australia